Whew may refer to:

Whew!, American game show
WHEW-AM, American radio station
WHEW-FM, American radio station now broadcasting as WWGR